The 1987 Miami Redskins football team was an American football team that represented Miami University in the Mid-American Conference (MAC) during the 1987 NCAA Division I-A football season. In its fifth season under head coach Tim Rose, the team compiled a 5–6 record (5–3 against MAC opponents), finished in a tie for second place in the MAC, and were outscored by all opponents by a combined total of 235 to 180.

The team's statistical leaders included Mike Bates with 2,218 passing yards, Jon Gist with 429 rushing yards, and Andy Schillinger with 574 receiving yards.

Schedule

References

Miami
Miami RedHawks football seasons
Miami Redskins football